is a Japanese single volume manga written and illustrated by Osamu Tezuka and published on April 20, 1949, by Tokodo.

Plot 
The rogue cop Ham Egg is plotting to take over a small town on the border region between New Mexico and Arizona. Only one thing stands in his way: a Native American sharpshooter known as "Monster". Aiding Monster are two other young sharpshooters, Anna and Jim, who combat Ham Egg and his gang to end corruption and liberate the town.

Characters 

Monster
A Native American who disguises himself as a masked cowboy to thwart Ham Egg's plot.
Anna
A female sharpshooter who helps Monster in his battle.
Jim
A young gunman who is assisting Monster in his fight for the town's freedom.
Ham Egg
A dastardly cop in the small town who hopes to take it over with the help of the mayor.
Baudelaire
Frederic Satton

See also
Osamu Tezuka
List of Osamu Tezuka manga
Osamu Tezuka's Star System

External links
Angel Gunfighter at TezukaOsamu.Net

Osamu Tezuka manga
Western (genre) anime and manga
1949 manga